is a railway station in the city of  Nihonmatsu, Fukushima Prefecture, Japan operated by East Japan Railway Company (JR East).

Lines

Station layout
The station has two opposed side platforms connected to the station building by a footbridge. The station is unattended.

Platforms

History
Sugita Station opened on December 19, 1948. The station was absorbed into the JR East network upon the privatization of the Japanese National Railways (JNR) on April 1, 1987.

Surrounding area
Sugita Post office

See also
 List of Railway Stations in Japan

External links
 

Stations of East Japan Railway Company
Railway stations in Fukushima Prefecture
Tōhoku Main Line
Railway stations in Japan opened in 1948
Nihonmatsu, Fukushima